= Sekolah Kebangsaan Guar Nangka =

Sekolah Kebangsaan Guar Nangka (SK Guar Nangka), is a national school in Kampung Guar Nangka in Malaysia. In 2009, Sekolah Kebangsaan Guar Nangka had 202 boys and 177 girls for a total student population of 379 . It has about 29 teachers
